Mantra is a 2007 Indian Telugu thriller film starring  Charmy Kaur and Sivaji. This film was directed by Tulasi Ram and produced by Ravi Prakash Bodapati and Kalyan Ram.

Diary (2009) was promoted as a sequel to this film; however, the two films are unrelated. Mantra 2 which claimed to be the sequel of Mantra was released in 2015 and has no connection with the Mantra crew.

Plot

Cast
 Charmy Kaur as Mantra
 Sivaji as Hero
 Karuna Sri as Vinny
 Kausha Rach
 Jeeva 
 Mallikarjuna Rao
 Rallapalli
 Karuna Bhushan 
 Chitram Seenu
 Vijay Sai

Production
Production was formally launched at a function in Annapurna studios on 27 October 2007. Regular shooting began 2 November and was completed in 40 working days. The setting for Mantra Nilayam was erected at Shamshabad exclusively and most of the film was shot there.

Soundtrack 
The songs were composed by Anand. The song "Maha Maha" is based on Black Eyed Peas' My Humps.

Release
The film was released on 14 December 2007. Although most movies at the end of year could not do well, Mantra proved to be a success with 80 to 90% collections. Charmy's popularity among the male youth came in as an added advantage to the movie. Suspense thriller is not a popular genre in Telugu film industry but commercial success of the film  A Film by Aravind changed the notion. Idlebrain, a popular website on Telugu film industry gives the film a rating of 3/5. Vijayanand Movies acquires the theatrical rights of the movie for worldwide except India.
Bhavani Media has acquired DVD rights.

The success of this film led the director, Tulasi Ram, and lead actress, Charmme Kaur, to work together on a similar themed film Mangala (2011).

Awards
 Nandi Award for Best Audiographer - Radha Krishna (2007)

References

External links
IdleBrain Review
indiaglitz

2007 films
2000s Telugu-language films
2007 horror films
2000s horror thriller films
Indian horror thriller films